Mary Lynn Stephens (born October 12, 1941 in Regina, Saskatchewan) is a former Canadian politician, who served as a BC Liberal Member of the Legislative Assembly of British Columbia from 1991 to 2005, representing the riding of Langley.

References

External links
Lynn Stephens

1941 births
21st-century Canadian politicians
21st-century Canadian women politicians
British Columbia Liberal Party MLAs
Women government ministers of Canada
Living people
Members of the Executive Council of British Columbia
Politicians from Regina, Saskatchewan
Women MLAs in British Columbia